The Clarion-Limestone Area School District is a small, rural, public school district which spans portions of two counties. In Clarion County, it serves the Borough of Strattanville and Clarion Township, Limestone Township and Millcreek Township. In Jefferson County it serves the Borough of Corsica and Union Township. According to 2000 federal census data, it serves a resident population of 7,173. In 2009, the District residents' per capita income was $17,013, while median family income was $38,633 per year.

Clarion-Limestone Area School District operates two schools; Clarion-Limestone Jr/Sr High School (7th–12th) and Clarion-Limestone Elementary School (K–6th).

References

School districts in Clarion County, Pennsylvania
School districts in Jefferson County, Pennsylvania